This is a full list of streets and squares in L'Eixample, a district of Barcelona, Catalonia, Spain.

List

A
Aldana,  d'
Alí Bei,  d'
Almogàvers,  dels
Anaïs Napoléon, jardins d' (Anaïs Napoleón)
Aragó,  d'
Aribau,  d'
Arts, plaça de les
Ausiàs Marc,  d'

B
Bailèn,  de
Balmes,  de
Batlló, passatge de
Beatriu de Provença, jardins de
Bergara,  de
Bocabella, passatge
Bofill, passatge de
Bosquet dels Encants, jardins del
Bruc,  del
Buenos Aires,  de

C

Calàbria,  de
Camps Elisis, passatge dels
Canonge Cluffí, passatge del
Caputxins, passatge dels
Carlit, jardins del
Cartagena,  de
Casanova,  de
Casp,  de
Catalunya, plaça de
Catalunya, rambla de
Centelles, passatge de
Cèsar Mantinell, jardins de
Cinc d'Oros, plaça de
Clotilde Cerdà, jardins de
Coll del Portell, passatge de
Comte Borrell,  del
Comte d'Urgell,  del
Concepció, passatge de la
Consell de Cent,  del
Constança d'Aragó, jardins de
Còrsega,  de

D

Diagonal, avinguda
Diputació,  de la
Doctor Ferrer i Cajigal, plaça del
Doctor Letamendi, plaça del
Doctor Robert, jardins del
Domingo, passatge de

E
Emerssenda de Carcassona, jardins d'
Emma de Barcelona, jardins d'
Enamorats,  dels
Enric Granados,  d'
Enriqueta Sèculi, jardins d'
Entença,  d'
Escoles, passatge de les
Estació del Nord, parc de l'

F
Flora Tristan, jardins de
Floridablanca,  de
Font, passatge de
Fontanella,  de

G

Gaiolà, passatge de
Gaudí, avinguda de
Gaudí, plaça de
Girona,  de
Goya, plaça de
Gràcia, passeig de
Gran Via de les Corts Catalanes

H
Henry Dunant, plaça d'
Hispanitat, plaça de la

I
Igualtat, passatge de la
Indústria,  de la
Indústria, jardins de la

J
Jaume Perich, jardins de
Joan Brossa, placeta de
Joan Casas, passatge de
Joan Miró, parc de
Avinguda de Josep Tarradellas, Barcelona

L
Laietana, Via
Laura Albéniz, jardins de
Lepant,  de
Lina Òdena, jardins de
Llançà,  de
Lluís Companys, passeig de
Londres,  de
Los Castillejos,  de

M
Maiol, passatge de
Mallorca,  de 
Manso,  de
Manuel de Pedrolo, jardins de
Marcos Redondo, jardins de
Maria Callas, jardins de
Marina,  de la
Marquès de Camposagrado,  del
Méndez Vigo, passatge de
Méndez Núñez,  de
Mercader, passatge de
Mercat, passatge del
Mercè Vilaret, jardins de
Meridiana, avinguda
Mistral, avinguda
Mossèn Jacint Verdaguer, plaça de
Montserrat Roig, jardins de
Muntaner,  de

N
Nàpols,  de
Nicaragua,  de
Núria, passatge de

P
Pablo Neruda, plaça de
Padilla,  de
Pagès, passatge de
París,  de
París, passatge de
Parlament,  del
Pau Claris,  de
Paula Montal, jardins de
Pere Calders, passatge de
Permanyer, passatge
Provença,  de

R
Rector Oliveras, jardins de
Rector Oliveras, passatge de
Ribes,  de
Rocafort,  de
Roger de Flor,  de
Roger de Flor, passatge de
Roger de Llúria,  de
Roma, avinguda
Rosselló,  del

S

Sagrada Família, plaça de la
Sagristà, passatge d'en
Sant Antoni Abat, passatge de
Sant Antoni Maria Claret,  de
Sant Joan, passeig de
Sant Pau, ronda de
Sant Pere, ronda de
Sardenya,  de
Sarrià, avinguda de
Sebastià Gasch, jardins de
Sepúlveda,  de
Sicília,  de
Simó, passatge de
Sofia Barat, jardins de

T
Tamarit,  de
Tarragona,  de
Tasso, passatge de
Tete Montoliu, jardins de
Tetuan, plaça de
Torre de les Aigües, jardins de la
Trafalgar,  de
Tres Tombs, jardins dels

U
Universitat, plaça de la
Universitat, ronda de la
Ureña, passatge d'
Urquinaona, plaça d'
Utset, passatge d'

V
València,  de
Valeri Serra, passatge de
Valls, passatge de
Viladomat,  de
Vilanova, avinguda de
Vilamarí,  de
Vilaret, passatge de
Villarroel,  de

See also 

 Urban planning of Barcelona

Eixample, Barcelona, streets and squares
Eixample, Barcelona, streets and squares
Streets and squares
Eixample, Barcelona, streets and squares
Eixample, Barcelona, streets and squares
Eixample